The 1986 Villanova Wildcats football team was an American football team that represented the Villanova University as an independent during the 1986 NCAA Division III football season. In their second year under head coach Andy Talley, the team compiled a 8–1 record.

Schedule

References

Villanova
Villanova Wildcats football seasons
Villanova Wildcats football